Torrey C. Harris (born March 12, 1991) is an American politician serving as a member of the Tennessee House of Representatives from the 90th district. Elected in 2020, he assumed office on January 12, 2021.

Alongside Eddie Mannis, Harris was one of the first two openly-LGBT state representatives elected in Tennessee.

On July 17, 2022, Harris was arrested for felony theft and misdemeanor assault, after police were called by Harris' ex-boyfriend.

References

1991 births
LGBT state legislators in Tennessee
LGBT African Americans
Democratic Party members of the Tennessee House of Representatives
Tennessee politicians convicted of crimes
Politicians from Memphis, Tennessee
21st-century American politicians
African-American state legislators in Tennessee
Living people
21st-century African-American politicians